2-Nitrocinnamaldehyde, ortho-nitrocinnamaldehyde or ''o''-nitrocinnamaldehyde is an organic aromatic compound containing a nitro group ortho- to the 1-position of cinnamaldehyde.

Synthesis

2-Nitrocinnamaldehyde can be synthesized by dissolving cinnamaldehyde to a solution of acetic anhydride in acetic acid, and adding a stoichiometric amount of concentrated nitric acid at 0–5 °C. Yields are around 36-46% of theoretical.

Nitration of cinnamaldehyde via acidification of a nitrate salt with H2SO4 also yields the ortho-nitro compound, however it also yields some of the para-nitro compound, which is generally undesired.

2-Nitrocinnamaldehyde can also be prepared by reacting 2-nitrobenzaldehyde with acetaldehyde in a condensation reaction.

Uses

2-Nitrocinnamaldehyde can be oxidized to 2-nitrocinnamic acid which can be used in the Baeyer-Emmerling indole synthesis to produce indole and substituted indoles.

References

Aldehydes
Nitrobenzenes